Van Eck is a Dutch toponymic surname. The name can be derived from Van Heck ("from fence"), but perhaps most families, including the noble family (Van Panthaleon) Van Eck, find their origin in the town Eck in Gelderland, first mentioned in the year 953. People with this surname include:

 Caroline van Eck (born 1959), Dutch art historian and academic
 Cornelis van Eck (1662–1732), Dutch jurist and poet
 Jos van Eck (born 1964), Dutch footballer
 Lubbert Jan van Eck (1719–1765), Dutch Baron and governor of Ceylon
 Pierre Vaneck (1931–2010), French actor of Belgian origin
 René van Eck (born 1966), Dutch footballer

References

Dutch-language surnames
Surnames of Dutch origin
Toponymic surnames